Henry Strong may refer to:

Henry Strong (ATSF), president of the Atchison, Topeka and Santa Fe Railway
Henry A. Strong (1838–1919), first president of Eastman Kodak Company
Henry G. Strong (1873–1919), New York businessman
Henry W. Strong (1810–1848), New York politician